The American Cinema Editors Award for Best Edited Non-Scripted Series is one of the annual awards given by the American Cinema Editors. The award was first presented at the 2008 ceremony.
 From 2008 to 2012 it was presented at Best Edited Reality Series.
 Since 2013 it is presented under its current name.

Winners and nominees
 † – indicates the winner of a Primetime Emmy Award (Unstructured Reality Program / Nonfiction Program).
 ‡ – indicates a nomination for a Primetime Emmy Award (Unstructured Reality Program / Nonfiction Program).

2000s
Best Edited Reality Series

2010s

Best Edited Non-Scripted Series

2020s

References

External links
 

American Cinema Editors Awards